Love Streams may refer to:

 Love Streams (film), a 1984 film directed by John Cassavetes
 Love Streams (album), a 2016 album by Tim Hecker